His Majesty's Theatre may refer to:

His Majesty's Theatre, Aberdeen, Scotland
His Majesty's Theatre, Brisbane, Australia
His Majesty's Theatre, Melbourne, Australia
His Majesty's Theatre, Perth, Australia
His Majesty's Theatre, London

See also
Her Majesty's Theatre (disambiguation)